Bewholme is a village and civil parish in the East Riding of Yorkshire, England.

The civil parish is formed by the villages of Bewholme and Dunnington and the hamlet of Nunkeeling.
According to the 2011 UK census, Bewholme parish had a population of 232, a slight increase on the 2001 UK census figure of 230.

The village has a church, St John Baptist, built in 1900 by S. Walker of Bridlington,  and football field. The former vicarage was designed by William Burges, who also drew up an unexecuted design for the church.

References

Sources

External links

Villages in the East Riding of Yorkshire
Civil parishes in the East Riding of Yorkshire